Bulldog Interactive is a British independent video games developer, established in 1999 with their central office located in Ashby-de-la-Zouch, Leicestershire, England. Bulldog specializes in cue sports games and is best known for developing the Cue Club series of pool and snooker simulations.

Background
Bulldog specializes predominantly in PC video games development, although it also has experience in making console games. As a small independent studio, Bulldog focuses its efforts primarily on developing its own in-house products, with the goal of creating unique, polished and entertaining experiences for the international gaming community.

Technology
Bulldog creates its games using the C and C++ programming languages, making use of DirectX technology for its PC titles. The studio uses a proprietary, internally developed engine, which it has evolved and adapted over the years to simulate the complexities of cue sport games.

Games developed 
 Cue Club (PC)
 Cue Club (Coin-op)
 Trickshot (PC)
 TG Pool (PC)
 World Cup of Pool (Nintendo DS - European release)
 World Cup of Pool (Nintendo DS - US release)
 Cue Club 2 (PC)

Publishers and Distribution Partners of Bulldog Games
 Microsoft
 Valve
 Nintendo
 Midas Interactive Entertainment
 Avanquest

References

External links
 

Video game companies established in 1999
Video game companies of the United Kingdom
Video game development companies
Companies based in Leicestershire
Ashby-de-la-Zouch
1999 establishments in England